Broderick is a surname of early medieval English origin and subsequently the Anglicised versions of names of Irish and Welsh origin. It is also a given name.

English origin 
A toponymic name the broad ridge and Bawdrip, a manor near Bridgwater see also Broadribb. Also a patronymic meaning son of Roderick. The name also has ties to the Vikings, mainly connected to the group of Norsemen that settled in England and coexisted with them after their initial raids in 793. The name has been thought to have been derived from a Norse personal name (Brodir).[2] Brodir (meaning "brother"). Or (Red/blood) from the Nordic word "Blodr", roughly translating to "blood brother" or "brother of red hair" some historians believe this was the family name given to some of the Norsemen who stayed behind in England.

Irish origin 
It is an Anglicised form of the Irish Ó Bruadair, meaning "descendant of Bruadar". The Irish Bruattar /Bruadar /Brodur is first recorded in 853, in the name of Bruattar mac Aeda, an Irish princeling from the south-east of Ireland. As a Norse personal name, Brodir is found in the name of a particular participant in the Battle of Clontarf and of a particular King of Dublin who was killed in 1160.

Welsh origin 
The name is an Anglicised form of the Welsh Prydderch, meaning "son of Rhydderch". The Welsh personal name Rhydderch was originally a byname meaning "reddish brown".

Use as a surname
Beth Broderick (born 1959), United States actress
Betty Broderick (born 1947), United States socialite, convicted of murder
Bonaventure Broderick (1868–1943), United States Bishop in Roman Catholic Church
Brendan Broderick (fl. 1990s-present), United States screenwriter  
Brian Broderick (born 1986), United States athlete in baseball
Carlfred Broderick (1932–1999), United States psychologist and family therapist
Case Broderick (1839–1920), United States politician from Kansas 
Chris Broderick (born 1970), United States musician, in the band Megadeth
Colin Broderick (fl. 2000s), Irish-born United States playwright 
Craig R. Broderick (born 1965), United States Entrepreneur, Actor and Music Producer
Damien Broderick (born 1944), Australian science fiction and popular science writer
D'Arcy Broderick (fl. 1990s-present), Canadian musician
David C. Broderick (1820–1859), United States politician and anti-slavery advocate
Edwin Broderick (1917–2006), United States prelate of Roman Catholic Church
Heather Woods Broderick (fl. 2000s), United States musician  
Helen Broderick (1891–1959), United States actress
Henry Broderick (fl. 1920s), Irish politician 
Henry Broderick (Seattle) (1880–1975), United States businessman and municipal leader in US state of Washington 
Jack Broderick (1877-?), Canadian athlete in lacrosse 
James Broderick (1927–1982), United States actor, father of Matthew Broderick
James Patrick Broderick (1891–1973), Irish Jesuit and writer 
John Broderick, any of several men with the name
Ken Broderick (born 1942), Canadian athlete in ice hockey 
Kevin Broderick (born 1977), Irish athlete 
Laurence Broderick (born 1935), British sculptor and educator
Len Broderick (born 1940), Canadian athlete in ice hockey 
Les Broderick (1921–2013), British pilot and survivor of the "Great Escape"
Lorraine Broderick, United States soap opera writer
Matt Broderick (1877–1940), United States athlete in baseball 
Matthew Broderick (born 1962), United States actor
Mike Broderick (born 1939), United States politician in South Dakota
Neville Broderick (born 1927), Australian athlete in Australian-rules football 
Paddy Broderick (1939–2020), Irish jockey
Pat Broderick (born 1953), United States comic book artist
Patricia Broderick (1925–2003), United States playwright and artist, mother of Matthew Broderick
Paul Broderick (born 1970), Australian athlete in Australian-rules football  
Peter Broderick (born 1987), United States musician
Raymond J. Broderick (1914–2000), United States politician and federal judge
Robert Broderick (fl. 2000s), Irish-born English comedian and performer  
Seán Broderick (1890–1953), Irish politician
Steve Broderick (fl. 1990s-present), United States musician 
Timothy J. Broderick (fl. 1980s-present), United States surgeon and educator
TS Broderick (1893–1962), Irish mathematician 
Vince Broderick (1920–2010), English athlete in cricket
Vincent L. Broderick (1920–1995), United States federal judge 
William Broderick (1877–1957), Irish politician and farmer

As a given name
Broderick Amollo (born 1991), Kenyan Advocate of the High Court
Broderick Bozimo (born 1939), Nigerian Minister of State and former Minister of Police Affairs
Broderick Chinnery (1742–1808), Irish politician and baronet
Broderick Crawford (1911–1986), American actor
Broderick Dyke (born 1960), Australian tennis player
Broderick Stephen Harvey or Steve Harvey (born 1957), American comedian and television presenter
Brodrick Haldane (1912–1996), Scottish-born society photographer
Broderick Henderson, American politician and member of the Kansas House of Representatives
Broderick Johnson (fl. 1990s-present), American film producer
Broderick Perkins (born 1954), American baseball player
Broderick Smith (born 1948), Australian musician
Broderick Thomas (born 1967), American football player
Broderick Thompson (1960–2002), American football player
Broderick Washington Jr. (born 1997), American football player
Broderick Wright (born 1987), Australian rugby player

Fictional characters
Broderick Bode, from the Harry Potter series of novels by J.K. Rowling

See also
Brodrick, given name and surname

References

Surnames of Irish origin
Anglicised Irish-language surnames
Anglicised Welsh-language surnames
Patronymic surnames
Surnames from given names
Irish masculine given names
Welsh masculine given names